Mickey the Detective is a 1928 silent short film in Larry Darmour's Mickey McGuire series starring a young Mickey Rooney. Directed by Albert Herman, the two-reel short was released to theaters in 1928 by Universal Pictures.

Plot
Mickey and the Scorpions starts his own detective agency. Stinkie Davis kidnaps Mickey's Kid Brudder and hides him in a box headed for a science professor. Mickey and the gang catch up with Mickey's brother, but soon get into a fight with Stinkie and his pals. The kids use some of the Professor's bombs as ammunition; these bombs just so happen to contain chemicals similar to laughing gas, and they literally make the kids high as a kite. Stinkie finally throws a high explosive bomb, which lands in the mouth of Buster, the Scorpions' dog. The bomb is set to go off at a certain time of the day. Wanting to avoid getting blown up, the kids are forced to avoid Buster at all costs.

Notes
An edited version was released to television in the 1960s as a part of the Those Lovable Scallawags With Their Gangs series.
This was one of the few Mickey McGuire shorts without Jimmy Robinson. Another kid takes over for the role of 'Hambone'.

Cast
Mickey Rooney - Mickey McGuire
Jimmy Robinson - Hambone Johnson
Delia Bogard - Tomboy Taylor
Marvin Stephens - Katrink
Buddy Brown - Stinkie Davis
Kendall McComas - Scorpions member

External links 
 

1928 films
1928 comedy films
American black-and-white films
American silent short films
Mickey McGuire short film series
1928 short films
Silent American comedy films
American comedy short films
1920s American films